Milan Heča (born 21 March 1991) is a Czech football player, who currently plays for Sparta Prague as a goalkeeper.

Club career
In July 2018, he joined Sparta Prague.

International career
In March 2022 he was called up to the senior Czech Republic squad and was on the bench for the friendly against Wales.

Career statistics

References

External links
 
 Guardian Football

1991 births
Living people
Czech footballers
Association football goalkeepers
Czech First League players
1. FC Slovácko players
AC Sparta Prague players
People from Břeclav District
Czech Republic youth international footballers
Sportspeople from the South Moravian Region